William Harkness (December 17, 1837 – February 28, 1903) was an astronomer. He was born at Ecclefechan, Scotland, a son of James (1803–78) and Jane (née Wield) Harkness. His father was a pastor and moved the family to the United States. Harkness served in the military, traveled extensively, and headed research missions developing techniques and equipment for astronomical study.

Harkness died in Jersey City on February 28, 1903, at the age of 65.

Biography
Harkness was educated at Lafayette College (1854–56), graduated from the University of Rochester (1858) where he was a brother of Delta Kappa Epsilon, and studied medicine in New York City. He served as a surgeon in the Union armies during part of the American Civil War. From 1862 to 1865 he was an "aid in astronomy" at the United States Naval Observatory and then, after service on the monitor  (1865–66), was employed in the Hydrographic Office.

During the eclipse of August, 1869, Harkness discovered the coronal line K 1474.  Three years later he was made a member of the Transit of Venus Commission, and had charge of the party at Hobart, Tasmania in 1879 and at Washington in 1882, when he became the executive officer.  His most memorable accomplishments are related to the construction of telescopes, his theory of the focal curve of achromatic telescopes, and his invention of the spherometer caliper and other astronomical instruments.  He was astronomical director of the Naval Observatory (1894–99) and director of the Nautical Almanac (1897–99).  He retired from the navy on attaining the relative rank of rear admiral (December, 1899). He was president of the American Association for the Advancement of Science (1893).  Of his works, The Solar Parallax and its Related Constants (1891) is the most important.

References

Further reading
- See especially Chapter 7.

External links
Chasing Venus, Observing the Transits of Venus Smithsonian Institution Libraries

1837 births
1903 deaths
Lafayette College alumni
Scottish emigrants to the United States
19th-century American astronomers
19th-century American inventors
Union Army surgeons
American non-fiction writers